Mississauga North  was a federal electoral district in  Ontario, Canada, that was represented in the House of Commons of Canada from 1979 to 1988.

This riding was created in 1976 from parts of Halton and Mississauga ridings.

It consisted of the part of the City of Mississauga, Ontario, lying north of a line drawn (from west to east) along Highway No. 5, Cawthra Road, and the Queen Elizabeth Way.

The electoral district was abolished in 1987 when it was redistributed between Mississauga East, Mississauga West and Mississauga South ridings.

Members of Parliament 

The riding elected the following Members of Parliament:

Electoral history

See also 

 List of Canadian federal electoral districts
 Past Canadian electoral districts

External links
 Library of Parliament website

Former federal electoral districts of Ontario
Politics of Mississauga